Fort Bainbridge was an earthen fort located along the Federal Road on what is today the county line between Macon and Russell counties in Alabama. Fort Bainbridge was located twenty-five miles west of Fort Mitchell.

History

Creek War
Fort Bainbridge was named in honor of naval captain William Bainbridge. Fort Bainbridge was built in the style of a bastion fort with eight outcroppings. The bastions were surrounded by a ditch that was filled with pickets and the fort was entered by a drawbridge. It was constructed in March 1814 by North Carolina militia under the command of General Joseph Graham in an effort to protect the supply route from Fort Hull to Fort Mitchell. Captain Jett Thomas directed the fort's construction. Fort Bainbridge allowed supply wagons to travel between Fort Mitchell and Hull in one-day intervals and was garrisoned by 100 to 300 troops. Fort Bainbridge was garrisoned by Tennessee militia until July 31, 1814.

Postwar
In 1820 on his North American tour, Adam Hodgson described Fort Bainbridge as being a "small stockaded mound". Captain Kendall Lewis (who commanded Benjamin Hawkins' scouts), along with his Creek chief father-in law, Big Warrior, operated a tavern as a stagecoach stop about 400 yards west of Fort Bainbridge, which stayed open under the care of Lewis' widow until at least 1836. During his return tour, the Marquis de Lafayette stayed at the Lewis Tavern for his first night in Alabama. Prince Bernhard of Saxe-Weimar-Eisenach stayed at the Lewis Tavern on his 1826 travels through North America. The site of the fort also lies along naturalist William Bartram's four-year journey through the Southern United States, during which he documented the flora, fauna and Native Americans of the area. The fort site was later used as a plantation.

Present
Today, it remains unmarked and its legacy lies in a small unincorporated community, Boromville, that developed from it. Though unmarked, the location is known and the area has been damaged by relic hunters.

References

Sources

External links
Detailed sketch of Fort Bainbridge from General Joseph Graham Papers

Bainbridge
Bainbridge
Creek War
Pre-statehood history of Alabama
Buildings and structures in Macon County, Alabama
Bainbridge
Bainbridge